Alexander Colquhoun may refer to:
 Alexander John Colquhoun, member of the Legislative Assembly of Saskatchewan
 Alexander Colquhoun (artist), Scottish-born painter and illustrator in Australia